The Tyrolean Eagle-Order is an honour awarded by the State of Tyrol. It was established by the National Council in 1970. It is awarded to personalities who have an excellent political, economic or cultural relationship with the State of Tyrol. The award ceremony takes place on October 25 of the respective year.

Classes
The order is divided into the 3 classes as follows:
Grand Tyrolean Eagle-Order (Großer Tiroler Adler-Orden)
Tyrolean Eagle-Order in Gold (Tiroler Adler-Orden in Gold)
Tyrolean Eagle-Order in Silver (Tiroler Adler-Orden in Silver)

Notable recipients
Below is a list of notable recipients, in chronological order with year of award in parentheses:.

Grand Tyrolean Eagle-Order
 Günther Granser
 Herbert Schambeck
 Wolfgang Schmidt
 Gerhard Bletschacher (1973)
 Fritz Molden (1979)
 Ludwig Jedlicka (1976)
 Herbert Batliner (1984)
 Jean Sévillia (1991)
 Peter Schmidhuber (1995)
 Anton Kathrein junior (2001)
 Brigitte Fassbaender (2002)
 Alain de Krassny (2002)
 Walter Hagg (2005)
 Edmund Stoiber (2007)
 Andreas Treichl (2012)
 François Biltgen (2013)
 Emilia Müller (2013)
 Reinhard Olt (2013)
 Axel Diekmann (2014)
 Hanni Wenzel (2016)
 Maha Chakri Sirindhorn (2017)
 Othmar Commenda (2018)
 Jean-Claude Juncker (2019)

Tyrolean Eagle-Order in Gold
 Ilse Dvorak-Stocker
 Alfred Hartl
 Friedrich Hoppe
 Roderich Regler
 Andreas Resch
 Luigi Ferdinando Tagliavini (1982)
 Holger Magel (1988)
 Horst Seidler (1996)
 Klemens Fischer (2008)
 Eberhard Stüber (2011)
 Alessandro Quaroni (2012)
 Nikolas Stihl (2012)
 Klaus Buchleitner (2016)
 Gert Vogt (2017)
 Ulrike Tanzer (2018)

Tyrolean Eagle-Order in Silver
 Udo Zehetleitner (2009)
 Erwin Mohr (2014)
 Ramón Jaffé (2015)
 Clemens Bieber (2016)
 Gebhard Kaiser (2016)
 Rudolf Lill

References

Orders, decorations, and medals of Austria
Awards established in 1970
1970 establishments in Austria
Orders of merit